The Botswana women's national football team nicknamed 'The Mares' (Female) is the women's national football team of Botswana and is controlled by the Botswana Football Association. They qualified for their maiden Africa Women Cup of Nations (AWCON) tournament that will be held in Morocco in July 2022.

Botswana played in the qualification for the 2002 African Championship, but lost in their first game. After this, they also took part in the qualification for the 2008 African Championship, where they played two matches and lost both to Namibia at the end of 2007. Botswana did not play again until the qualification for the 2010 Championship, where they lost both matches, this time against Democratic Republic of the Congo. For these games, Botswana named an entirely U20 national team. They have also played games since they were eliminated from qualification.

History

Botswana played their first match in Harare, Zimbabwe on April 19, 2002, against South Africa in a series of friendlies. They lost 14–0. After this match they lost 3–0 against Swaziland and 7–1 against Mozambique, in where they scored their first goal.

Botswana's first major competition was in the 2008 African Women's Championship, in where after 5 years they played an international match, this time against Namibia. Zebras lost both legs by 3–0 and 6–1.

Botswana had played with Zambia on 4 May 2008 and lost 4–2.

With a U20 team, Zebras played 2010 African Women's Championship qualifiers against Congo DR and again lost both legs, this time by 2–0 and 5–2 and did not qualify for either the 2010 African Women's Championship and the 2011 FIFA Women's World Cup

A series of friendlies occurred in October 2010, against Zambia on 2 and 23 October, lost 1–4 and 1–2 respectively; against Tanzania on 25 October and 26 October, lost 2–3 and draw 1–1. In the next year, March 2011, they again played against Namibia and lost 1–0.

In 2011, one of the two friendlies in April and May with South Africa marked their first victory, by 1–0. The other match was lost 4–0. In August, they played against Tanzania on 2 August, losing 3–1; South Africa on August 3, losing 4–0 and against Zambia, also losing, 4–1.

They entered the 2012 African Women's Championship qualifiers and played against Zimbabwe, and was eliminated by an aggregate score of 3–1, due to losing the two legs by 1–0 and 2–1. Last friendlies in 2012 include two losses against South Africa (3–0) and Zimbabwe (5–0).

Before the 2014 African Women's Championship qualifiers, the team played the first 2014 matches, against Swaziland on 7 and 8 January and won for the second and third time, by 3–0 and 3–1. The first leg of the qualifiers for the African Championship started on 14 February with a loss against Zimbabwe 1–0 and the second leg was played on 2 March, with another loss, by 2–1, Botswana ended eliminated from the African Championship and the World Cup. On June 7 of the same year, they played against South Africa, losing 4–0.

Team image

Home stadium
The Botswana women's national football team plays their home matches on the Botswana National Stadium.

Results and fixtures

 

The following is a list of match results in the last 12 months, as well as any future matches that have been scheduled.

Legend

2022
  

 

Source :global sport

Coaching staff

Current coaching staff
last update  October2022

Manager history

Gaoletlhoo Nkutlwisang (2021–)

Players

Current squad
  This is the Final Squad named in October 2022 For friendly game  against .

 Caps and goals accurate up to and including 30 October 2021.

Recent call-ups
The following players have been called up to a Botswana  squad in the past 12 months.

Previous squads

Africa Women Cup of Nations
2022 Women's Africa Cup of Nations squads

COSAFA Women's Championship
2020 COSAFA Women's Championship squad
2022 COSAFA Women's Championship squad

Records

 Active players in bold, statistics correct as of 2020.

Most capped players

Top goalscorers

Honours

Regional
COSAFA Women's Championship
  Runners-up: 2020

Competitive record

FIFA Women's World Cup

*Draws include knockout matches decided on penalty kicks.

Olympic Games

Africa Women Cup of Nations

African Games

COSAFA Women's Championship

*Draws include knockout matches decided on penalty kicks.

Honours

All−time record against FIFA recognized nations
The list shown below shows the Djibouti national football team all−time international record against opposing nations.
*As of xxxxxx after match against  xxxx.
Key

Record per opponent
*As ofxxxxx after match against  xxxxx.
Key

The following table shows Djibouti's all-time official international record per opponent:

See also

Sport in Botswana
Football in Botswana
Women's football in Botswana
Botswana women's national under-20 football team
Botswana women's national under-17 football team
Botswana men's national football team

References

External links
Official website 
FIFA profile, FIFA.com 

 
African women's national association football teams